Ron Bain is a Scottish television actor, director, producer, comedian and former stage actor who now focuses primarily on directing. He is known for his work with comedian Rikki Fulton, with whom he first worked while performing Molière's The Miser at the Royal Lyceum Theatre, Edinburgh, in 1971 and for his productions spotlighting Fulton's character 'the Reverend I. M. Jolly'.

Career

In 1977 Bain appeared as the weasely villain 'Danny the Busker' in The XYY Man, but he is best known for his work in comedy, rounding up sketches in Naked Video
with stars such as Gregor Fisher, Elaine C Smith, Jonathan Watson, Helen Lederer, John Sparkes, Andy Gray, Tony Roper, Louise Beattie and Kate Donnelly.

He also appeared in A Kick Up the Eighties, Laugh??? I Nearly Paid My Licence Fee and several episodes of Rab C Nesbitt.

Bain has also made live performances, such as a 1988 benefit for the Scottish Ballet.

Filmography 
 As actor (Television)

 The View from Daniel Pike (1 episode, 1971)
 Adam Smith (4 episodes, 1972)
 Weir of Hermiston (1 episode, 1973)
 BBC Play of the Month (1 episode, 1975)
 ITV Playhouse (1 episode, 1977)
 The XYY Man (1 episode, 1977)
 The Standard (1 episode, 1978)
 Tycoon (1 episode, 1978)
 Kids (1 episode, 1979)
 Play for Today (1 episode, 1980)

 Juliet Bravo (1 episode, 1980)
 Strangers (1 episode, 1980)
 Boswell for the Defence (1981)
 A Kick Up the Eighties (1981)
 Laugh??? I Nearly Paid My Licence Fee (1984)
 Taggart (1 episode, 1985)
 Naked Video (1986–1987)
 The Tales of Para Handy (1 episode, 1994)
 Rab C. Nesbitt (3 episodes, 1991–1998)

 As actor (film)
 Experience Preferred... But Not Essential (1982)
 As director (TV)

 City Lights (1986)
 I, Lovett (1989)
 Rab C. Nesbitt (1990)
 Tis' the Season to be Jolly (1993)
 Jolly a Man for All Seasons (1994)
 Jolly: A Life (1995)
 Pulp Video (1995)
 The Tales of Para Handy (3 episodes, 1994–1995)
 Bad Boys (1 episode, 1996)

 It's a Jolly Life (1999)
 Rikki Fulton: The Time of his Life (1999)
 Brotherly Love (6 episodes, 2000)
 The Bill (4 episodes, 2001–2002)
 Snoddy (2002)
 Only an Excuse? (2003)
 The Karen Dunbar Show (2003)
 River City (1 episode, 2008)

 As director (Video)
 Scotch & Wry 4: Rikki Fulton Prince of Pochlers (1992)
 Francie & Josie: The Farewell Performance (1996)
 The Best of Rikki Fulton: Rikki Fulton's Scotch & Wry Hogmanay 1996 (1997)
 Rikki Fulton's Rev. IM Jolly & Friends (2004)

Recognition 
In his review of Experience Preferred... But Not Essential, Tom Sabulis of St. Petersberg Times wrote that Bain was a "warm, welcome presence".  David Belcher of Glasgow Herald offered that Rab C. Nesbitt was deftly directed by Bain.

References

External links 
 

Living people
Year of birth missing (living people)
Scottish male stage actors
Scottish male television actors